Wong Wing v. United States, 163 U.S. 228 (1896), was a United States Supreme Court case in which the Court found that the Fifth and Sixth Amendments to the U.S. Constitution forbid the imprisonment at hard labor without a jury trial for noncitizens convicted of illegal entry to or presence in the United States.

The case began in 1892 when Wong Wing and three other Chinese nationals were arrested for unlawful presence in the United States, violating the Geary Act. A commissioner of the Circuit Court for the Eastern District of Michigan sentenced the four men to 60 days imprisonment at hard labor, after which they would be deported to China. After the prisoners' petitions, for writs of habeas corpus were denied, the Supreme Court granted cert.

In May 1896, the Supreme Court reversed the circuit court's judgment, ruling that Wing's Fifth and Sixth Amendment rights were violated because the commissioner lacked jurisdiction to sentence Wing to imprisonment at hard labor. The circuit court shouldn't have denied Wing's habeas corpus petition because Wing was sentenced to a criminal punishment without a jury trial. Thus the Court reversed the circuit court's judgment. 

This case established that noncitizens subject to criminal proceedings are entitled to the same constitutional protections available to citizens. The Court held that the protections guaranteed by the Fifth and Sixth Amendments extend to foreign nationals as well as American citizens. The ruling was issued on the same day as the Court upheld racial segregation laws in its infamous Plessy v. Ferguson decision.

Background

Geary Act 
The Geary Act of 1892, an extension of the Chinese Exclusion Act, denied U.S. citizenship to Chinese immigrants. The Act required Chinese residents to carry residence certificates issued by the federal government to prove they entered the country legally. Section 4 of the Act of 1892 provides:

Briefly, Chinese individuals unlawfully present in the U.S. faced up to a year of imprisonment and hard labor followed by deportation.

Incident 
On July 15, 1892, John Graves, commissioner of the U.S. Circuit Court for the Eastern District of Michigan, ruled that Wong Wing, Lee Poy, Lee You Tong, and Chan Wah Dong were illegal Chinese in the United States and had no right to remain in the United States. John Graves ruled that these people be imprisoned in the Detroit House of Correction for 60 days of hard labor from and including the date of commitment; in the end, they were to be removed from the United States to China.

The Chinese thus immediately applied for a writ of habeas corpus to the judges of the United States Court for the Eastern District of Michigan, requesting the release of their imprisonment and restraint of their liberty, alleging that doing so was unlawful, without warrant of law and contrary to the Constitution and laws of the United States. The rules were based on the Geary Act of1892,  entitled "An Act to prohibit the coming of Chinese persons into the United States."

District Appeal 
On July 22nd, 1892, after hearing arguments from counsel, the district court ordered that the writ of habeas corpus be discharged and that the persons arrested be remanded to the custody of Nicholson, the keeper of the District house of correction, to serve their original sentences. Based on this decision, an appeal was filed with the Supreme Court. The United States Supreme Court granted certiorari.

Opinion of the Court 
In a majority opinion by Justice Shiras, the Court explained that Congress has the power to exclude, deport, and detain classes of noncitizens as a matter of public policy. Because deportation isn't a criminal punishment, Congress may deport noncitizens without a jury trial. However, imprisonment at hard labor is a criminal punishment, and imposing criminal punishment without a jury trial to establish a defendant's guilt violates the Fifth and Sixth Amendments. The Court emphasized that constitutional protections aren't limited to United States citizens. Any person within the United States is entitled to the protections guaranteed by the Fifth and Sixth Amendments. As a resident in the United States, Wong Wing is entitled to the Fifth Amendment right to due process and the Sixth Amendment right to a jury trial. Wing was being held without being afforded those protections. Accordingly, Wing's petition for a writ of habeas corpus was granted. The judgment of the circuit court was reversed.

The Court first emphasized the validity of Chae Chan Ping v. United States (130 U.S. 581). Mr. Justice Field held that the Act to exclude Chinese laborers from the United States was a constitutional exercise of legislative power. The Court affirmed that Section 6 of the May 5, 1892 Act was constitutional and valid by reaffirming Fong Yue Ting v. United States (149 U.S. 698). The Court then cited Lem Moon Sing v. United States (158 U.S. 538), in which the Court rejected the petitioner's writ of habeas corpus. Mr. Justice Harlan, expressing the opinion of the Court, said that Congress exercised its power to exclude aliens solely through the executive, without judicial intervention, as determined by our previous decisions. 

The Court pointed out the present appeal presented a different question the questions previously determined. The current question was whether a Chinese person can be lawfully convicted and sentenced to imprisonment at hard labor for a definite period by a commissioner without indictment or trial by jury. The question involved the constitutionality of Section 4 of the Act of 1892. the Court argued that:

However, the Geary Act imposed imprisonment and hard labor in addition to deportation in an attempt to deter violations of the Act. To this regard, the Court expressed: 

The Court then cited Ex parte Wilson (114 U.S. 428) to declare that incarceration at hard labor was considered an infamous punishment. Also, in Yick Wo v. Hopkins (118 U.S. 356, 369), the Court ruled the Fourteenth Amendment to the Constitution is not limited to the protection of citizens. The Court applied the rule of the Fourteenth Amendment to the Fifth and Sixth Amendments.

The Court finally decided that Section 4 of the 1892 Act was invalid because it conflicted with the Fifth Amendment to the Constitution, which states that "no person shall be held to answer for a capital, or other infamous crime, unless on a presentment or indictment of a grand jury, ... nor be deprived of life, liberty or property without due process of law," and is also in conflict with the Sixth Amendment to the Constitution, which provides" in all criminal proceedings, the accused shall enjoy the right to a speedy and public trial, by an impartial jury of the State and district wherein the crime shall have been committed."

The Court reversed the judgment of the Circuit Court.

Concurring and Dissenting Decision 
Justice Field concurred in part and dissented in part.

Justice Field agreed that Wong was entitled to be discharged from his arrest and imprisonment because the government could only lawfully punish both citizens and noncitizens after a jury trial. However, he expressed deep concern about the government's argument that constitutional protections do not apply to political offenses committed by those who illegally enter and remain in the United States. He emphasized that the right to deport and exclude noncitizens does not give the government the right to inflict harsh and brutal punishment on them without constitutional safeguards.

Justice Brewer took no part in the decision of this case.

Significance 
Wong Wing v. United States was the first Supreme Court decision to invalidate a federal immigration statute, the first Supreme Court decision to hold that the Bill of Rights protects aliens from the federal government, and the first Supreme Court decision to affirm the constitutional rights of illegal aliens. Wong Wing v. United States addressed the power of Congress over immigration, the constitutional protection of aliens from the federal government, the rights of illegal aliens, the distinction between civil detention and criminal penalties, and the nature of hard labor as punishment.

A series of decisions issued by the judiciary in the 1880s and 1890s gave the executive branch broad authority to impose immigration restrictions in the name of national security. In Wong Wing v. United States, the Supreme Court further distinguished deportation from punishment. This decision placed immigration in a separate government bureaucracy. Since then, immigration cases have been handled by immigration officials, and an independent immigration court system has made legal decisions with fewer civic protections. 

Wong Wing v. United States reaffirmed that deportation itself is not a punishment. This finding was later used to suggest that while immigration law violators cannot be sentenced to prison without constitutional due process, they can be detained - i.e., imprisoned - pending deportation. Extending Wong Wing's rationale, the Court held that because deportation is not punishment, indefinite incarceration pending deportation is not punishment either. Similarly, deportation is a civil action and not a criminal action.

See also 
 Geary Act
 Plessy v. Ferguson
 Chinese Exclusion Act
 Detroit House of Correction
 Chae Chan Ping v. United States
 Fong Yue Ting v. United States
 Yick Wo v. Hopkins

References

External links
 
 

1896 in Michigan
1896 in United States case law
1896 in Detroit
May 1896 events
United States Supreme Court cases
United States Supreme Court cases of the Fuller Court
Chinese-American history
Asian-American culture in Metro Detroit
United States due process case law
United States immigration and naturalization case law